Meat and potato pie is a popular variety of pie eaten in England. Meat and potato pie comes in many versions and consists of a pastry casing containing: potato, either lamb or beef, and sometimes carrot and/or onion. They can often be bought in a speciality pie shop, a type of bakery concentrating on pies, or in a chip shop. A meat and potato pie has a similar filling to a Cornish Pasty and differs from a meat pie in that its content is usually less than 50% meat. They can be typically eaten as take-aways but are a homemade staple in many homes. Often it is served with red cabbage.

In 2004, ITV's The Paul O'Grady Show voted the produce of The Denby Dale Pie Company as the UK's best Meat and Potato Pie.

In 2017, Martin Appleton-Clare set a new speed eating record at the World Pie Eating Championship in Wigan, Greater Manchester. Appleton-Clare retained his title, by finishing the meat and potato pie in 32 seconds.

See also
 Wrap roti
 Shepherd's pie
 List of pies, tarts and flans
 List of potato dishes

References

British pies
English cuisine
Potato dishes
Savoury pies
Meat and potatoes dishes